Ethel Johnson may refer to:
 Ethel Johnson (athlete)
 Ethel Johnson (wrestler)